The Khalwati order (also known as Khalwatiyya, Khalwatiya, or Halveti, as it is known in Turkey) is an Islamic Sufi brotherhood (tariqa). Along with the Naqshbandi, Qadiri, and Shadhili orders, it is among the most famous Sufi orders. The order takes its name from the Arabic word khalwa, meaning “method of withdrawal or isolation from the world for mystical purposes.”

The order was founded by Umar al-Khalwati in the city of Herat in medieval Khorasan (now located in western Afghanistan). However, it was Umar's disciple, Yahya Shirvani, who founded the “Khalwati Way.”  Yahya Shirvani wrote Wird al-Sattar, a devotional text read by the members of nearly all the branches of Khalwatiyya.

The Khalwati order is known for its strict ritual training of its dervishes and its emphasis of individualism. Particularly, the order promoted individual asceticism (zuhd) and retreat (khalwa), differentiating themselves from other orders at the time. The order is associated as one of the source schools of many other Sufi orders.

History

14th to 17th centuries 
There were two major historical movements of the Khalwati order. The first one started in the late 14th century and ended in the 17th century. The first historical movement marks its origins and spread in vast area, now being part of Iran, Iraq, Syria, and Turkey. The second movement began in the late 15th century to the mid-19th century mostly focused in Egyp], considered the reform period of the Khalwati order. The order lost popularity in 1865, but many of its leaders branched off to form different orders to expand Islam throughout Africa.  The order resided mostly in large urban areas.

Al-Hasan Al-Basri, Umar al-Khalwati, the establishment of the Khalwati order, and Sayyeed Yahya Shirvani

 Al-Hasan Al-Basri is known as pir of the pirs which by all the 12 tariqa orders have their silsilas from. He also added that Umar al-Khalwati is a shaykh that died in seclusion after being in it for 40 days. He continued to point out that all the other orders have their silsila from Khalwati. Because in order to achieve self-fulfilment a murid or dervish need to practice Khalwa. Then we have the others that attribute Umar al-Khalwati as its founder, or the "first pir". However, Umar- Khalwati was considered a mysterious man who did very little to spread the order. Shaykh Yahya Shirvani was considered "the second pir" that was responsible for the spread of the Khalwati order. Yahya Shirvani lived during a time of great political instability in the wake of the Mongol invasion. After the Mongol invasions, Turkish nomads began to gather into urban centers of the Islamic world. All these cities had Sufi shaykhs performing miracles for the nomads. Thus, these Turkish nomads were easily converted to mystical Islam when the Sufi shaykhs promised them union with Allah. Yahya Shirvani entered Baku at this time of religious fervor and political instability, and he was able to start a movement. Yahya Shirvani was able to gather ten thousand people to his movement. Yahya had many popular, charismatic disciples to spread the order, including Pir Ilyas.

The period of the Ottoman Sultan Bayazid II and Sheikh Chelebi Khalifa
The time of greatest popularity for Khalwati order was during the thirty-year reign of “Sufi Bayazid II” (1481–1511) in Ottoman Turkey. During this time, the sultan practiced Sufi rituals, which, without a doubt, brought in many people to the order who wanted to advance their political career. This is the time period where members of the upper class, Ottoman military, and higher ranks of civil services were all involved with the Khalwati order. The Sufi sheikh, Chelebi Khalifa, moved the headquarters of the Khalwati order from Amasya to Istanbul. Here, they rebuilt a former church into a tekke, or Sufi lodge. The tekke became known as the Koca Mustafa Pasha Mosque. These buildings spread throughout the region as Khalwati's popularity grew. The order spread from its origins in the Middle East to the Balkans (especially in southern Greece, Kosovo and North Macedonia, to Egypt, Sudan and almost all corners of the Ottoman Empire.

The period of Sunbul Efendi
After Chelebi Khalifa's death, the power was passed to his son-in-law, Sunbul Efendi. He was considered a very spiritual man that saved the Koca Mustafa Pasha Mosque. According to the miraculous account, the new sultan Selim I, was suspicious of the Khalwati order and wanted to destroy its tekke. Selim I sent workers to tear down the tekke, but an angry Sunbul Efendi turned them away. Hearing this, Selim I went down there himself only to see hundreds of silent dervishes gathered around Shaykh Sunbul dressed with his khirqa. Selim was astonished by Sunbul's spiritual power and canceled the plans to destroy the tekke.

The attacks from the ulama, the orthodox religious class, were more serious in the long run. Their hostility were on many Sufi orders, not just the Khalwatiya. Their criticism was a political concern, which suggested that they Khalwatis were disloyal to the Ottoman state, and a doctrinal concern, that the Sufis were thought by the ulama to be too close to folk Islam and too far from the shari'a. The ulama also held a cultural hostility towards them, which made the ulama intolerant of the Sufis.

The periods of the Wali Sha`ban-i Kastamoni and `Omer el-Fu'ad-i, and the Kadizadeli movement
The order began to transform itself over the course of the 16th and 17th centuries as it became more embedded in Ottoman social and religious life. A good example of this is the branch of the order founded by Sha`ban-i Veli (d. 1569) in Kastamonu. Whereas Sha`ban was a retiring ascetic who kept a low profile in the 16th century, by the 17th century his spiritual follower `Omer el-Fu'adi (d. 1636) wrote multiple books and treatises that sought to cement the order's doctrines and practices, in addition to combatting a growing anti-Sufi feeling that later took shape in the form of the Kadizadeli movement. Also during this period, the order sought to reassert its Sunni identity, by disassociating itself with the Shi’i enemy. With the reign of Sulayman the Magnificent and Selim II the order entered a revival. They had links with many high-ranking officials in the Ottoman administration and received substantial donations in cash and property, which helped to recruit more members.

The influences of Niyazi al-Misri
By this time, members of the Khalwati order broke ties with the common people, who they previously aligned themselves so closely. They attempted to rid the order of folk Islam to a more orthodox order. The Khalwati was very conscious of their public image and wanted the order to become more of an exclusive membership for the upper class. From here, the Khalwati order broke off into many suborders. In 1650s rose one of the most famous Anatolian Khalwati shaykhs, Niyazi al-Misri. Niyazi was famous for his poetry, his spiritual powers, and public opposition to the government. He was a leader that represented the old Khalwati order, one for the masses. Niyazi gave the common people and their spiritual aspirations a voice again in the Khalwati order. Niyazi's poetry demonstrates some of the Khalwati's aspects of retreat. He writes in one of his poems:

"I thought that in the world no friend was left for me--
I left myself, and lo, no fiend was left for me"

18th and 19th centuries: Khalwati reform 
Most scholars believe that the Khalwati went through a revival during the 18th century when Mustafa ibn Kamal ad-Din al-Bakri (1688-1748) was in charge. Al-Bakri was considered a great shaykh who wrote many books, invented Sufi techniques, and was very charismatic. He travelled throughout Jerusalem, Aleppo, Istanbul, Baghdad, and Basra. Before he died he wrote 220 books, mostly about adab. It is said that he saw the prophet nineteen times and al-Khidr three times. In many cities, people would mob al-Bakri to receive his blessing. After al-Bakri died, Khalwati dome scholars believe that al-Bakri set “a great Sufi renaissance in motion.” He was considered the reformer who renewed the Khalwati order in the Egypt. The Khalwati order still remains strong in Egypt where the Sufi orders do receive a degree of support from the government. The Khalwati order also remains strong in the Sudan.

However, not all scholars agree with al-Bakri's influence. Frederick de Jong argues in his collected studies that al Bakri's influence was limited. He argues that many scholars speak of his influence, but without much detail about what he actually did. Jong argues that al-Bakri's influence was limited to adding a prayer litany to the Khalwati rituals. He made his disciples read this litany before sunrise and called it the Wird al-sahar. Al-Bakri wrote this prayer litany himself and thought it necessary to add it to the practices of the Khalwati order. Jong argues al-Bakri should not be attributed with the revival of the Sufi order for his limited effect.

19th-century political influence 
Members of the Khwalti order were involved in political movements by playing a huge role in the Urabi insurrection in Egypt. The order helped others oppose British occupation in Egypt. The Khalwati groups in Upper Egypt protested British occupation due to high taxes and unpaid labor, which, in addition to drought, made living very hard in the 1870s. Their protests blended with the large stream nationalist protests that lead up to the Urabi insurrection. It can be said that the Khalwati's fight to improve living conditions eventually lead to the larger nationalist protests.

20th century to modern day 
The situation varies from region to region. In 1945, the government in Albania recognized the principal tariqas as independent religious communities, but this came to an end after the Albanian Cultural Revolution in 1967. In 1939 there were twenty-five Khalwatiyya tekkes in Albania, Macedonia and Kosovo. In 1925 the orders were abolished in Turkey and all tekkes and zawiyas were closed and their possessions confiscated by the government, and there is no data available on the status of the Khalwatiyya. In Egypt there are still many active branches of the Khalwatiyya.

Modernity has affected the orders to have quite different forms in different environments. They vary depending on the locality, personality of the shaykh and the needs of the community. There may also be different prayer practices, patterns of association, and the nature of relations linking the disciples to the shaykh and to each other.

Khalwati tekkes 
The Khalwati order had many tekkes in Istanbul, the most famous being the Jerrahi, Ussaki, Sunbuli, Ramazani and Nasuhi. Although the Sufi orders are now abolished in the Republic of Turkey, the above are almost all now mosques and/or places of visitation by Muslims for prayer.

Active branches in the Ottoman era 
 Pîr İlyas Amâsî branch
 Seyyid Yâhyâ-yı Şirvânî branch
  Molla Hâbib Karamanî sub-branch  
  Cemâli’îyye sub-branch  (Followers of Çelebi Hâlife Cemâl-i Halvetî)
 Sünbül’îyye
 Assâl’îyye
 Bahş’îyye
 Şâbân’îyye
 Karabaş’îyye
 Bekr’îyye
 Kemal’îyye
 Hufn’îyye
 Tecân’îyye
 Dırdîr’îyye
 Sâv’îyye
 Semmân’îyye
 Feyz’îyye
 Nasûh’îyye
 Çerkeş’îyye
 İbrahim’îyye/Kuşadav’îyye
 Halîl’îyye
  Ahmed’îyye sub-branch  (Followers of Yiğitbaşı Ahmed Şemseddîn bin Îsâ Marmarâvî)
 Ramazan’îyye
 Buhûr’îyye
 Cerrah’îyye
 Raûf’îyye
 Cihângir’îyye
 Sinan’îyye
 Muslih’îyye
 Zeherr’îyye
 Hayât’îyye
 Uşşâk’îyye
 Câhid’îyye
 Selâh’îyye
 Niyâz’îyye/Mısr’îyye
 Beyûm’îyye
  Rûşen’îyye sub-branch  (Followers of Dede Ömer-i Rûşenî)
 Gülşen’îyye
 Sezâ’îyye
 Hâlet’îyye
 Demirtâş’îyye
  Şems’îyye sub-branch  (Followers of Şemseddîn Ahmed Sivâsî)

Khalwati practices 
The hallmark of the Khalwatiyya tariqa, way, and its numerous subdivisions is its periodic retreat (khalwa) that is required of every novice. These can last between three days to forty days. The khalwa for some offshoots of the Khalwatiyya is essential in preparing the pupil, murid. The collective dhikr follows similar rules throughout the different branches of the Khalwatiyya order. The practice of dhikr is described as repetitive prayer. The practitioner is to be repeating Allah's name and remembering Allah. The dervish is to be attentive to Allah in their repetitive prayer.  They are to be completely focused on Allah, so much so that an early Sufi master says "True dhikr is that you forget your dhikr."  Another practice that distinguishes the Khalwatiyya from other tariqas is that for them it is through participation in the communal rites and rituals that one reaches a more advanced stage of awareness, one that the theorists of the order described as a face-to-face encounter with Allah.

Khalwati sub-orders
 Khalwatiyya Sammaniyya
 Gulshani
 Jelveti
 Jerrahi
 Nur Ashki Jerrahi
 Karabashi
 Nasuhi
 Rahmani
 Sha`bani
 Sunbuli
 Ussaki

See also 

 Raag Khalawati
 Bayramiye

Notes

References 
 Clayer, Nathalie, Muslim Brotherhood Networks, European History Online, Mainz: Institute of European History, 2011, retrieved: May 23, 2011.

External links
 Home page of the Halveti-Ramazani order
 Home page of the Halveti-Ussaki order (English/Turkish)
 Sub-order page of the Halveti-Ussaki order (Turkish)
 Home page of the Halveti-Jerrahi order
 Home page of the Halveti-Shabani order
 Home page of the Halveti-Sivasi order
 Halveti branches
 Home page of the Halveti-Ramazani order
 The Unveiling of Love Sufism and the Remembrance of God By Sheikh Muzaffer Ozak
 IRSHAD Wisdom of a Sufi Master By Sheikh Muzaffer Ozak Al-Jerrahi
 Garden of Paradise – Sufi Ceremony of Remembrance – Music CD Sheikh Muzzafer Ozak and the Halveti-Jerrahi Order of Dervishes
 Lifting the Boundaries: Muzaffer Efendi and the Transmission of Sufism to the West by Gregory Blann
 A link to numerous articles on Sufism including the Khalwati order.

Sunni Sufi orders